Selenops is a spider genus that is found in many arid regions of the world, but some species may also be found in some cooler and even mountainous regions. Most of the 132 species (as of May. 2021) are hard to visually distinguish, and requires study of their finer anatomy.

S. australiensis is found on or under dry bark in Australia. The female reaches 9mm, the male 7mm. It looks superficially like a huntsman spider.

S. radiatus has proved to be an effective controlling agent of the potato tuber moth in South Africa.

Selenops is the first spider known to be able to steer and glide when falling, in order to land in or on a tree, instead of falling to the ground.

Selenops spiders are able to attack prey approaching from all directions. When attacking prey from behind, they show some of the fastest turning movements documented in terrestrial legged animals.

Name
Named after the moon goddess Selene, and Greek -ops "eye", because of the moon-like form of the eyes.

Selected species
 Selenops australiensis
 Selenops aztecus Valdez-Mondragon, 2010
 Selenops galapagoensis
 Selenops lobatse
 Selenops muehlmannorum Jager & Praxaysombath, 2011
 Selenops nesophilus
 Selenops radiatus
 Selenops rosario
 Selenops submaculosus

References

External links

 Picture of Selenops sp.
 Picture of S. australiensis

Selenopidae
Araneomorphae genera
Spiders of North America
Spiders of South America
Spiders of Asia
Spiders of Africa